The 2015–16 season was Olympiacos's 57th consecutive season in the Super League Greece and their 90th year in existence. The club was managed to become the champions for 6th consecutive year and for 18th time during the last 20 seasons. Olympiacos also participated in the Greek Football Cup, losing at the final against AEK athens. They also took part in the UEFA Champions League (group stage) and the UEFA Europa League (knockout phase, round of 32).

Players

For recent transfers, see List of Greek football transfers summer 2015

Olympiacos U20 squad 

Olympiacos U20 is the youth team of Olympiacos. They participate in the Super League U20 championship and in UEFA Youth League competition. They play their home games at the 3,000-seater Renti Training Centre in Renti, Piraeus.

Transfers and loans

Transfers in

 (fee:free transfer)
 (fee:free transfer)
 (fee:free transfer)
 (fee: €2M)
 (fee:free transfer)
 (fee:free transfer)
 (fee: €5M)
 (loan until 30 June 2016) (fee: €1.5M)
 (loan until 30 June 2016) (fee: €1M)
 (fee: €4.5M)
 (fee: €2M)
 (fee: €0.8M)
 (fee: free transfer)
 (fee: €0.5M)
 (fee: €1.8M)
(loan return)
(loan return)

(fee:free transfer)
(loan return)

Total spending: €19,800,000

Transfers out

 (until 30 June 2016)
 (until 30 June 2016)
 (until 30 June 2016)
 (until 30 June 2016)
 (until 31 December 2015)
 (until 30 June 2016)
 (until 30 June 2016)
 (until 30 June 2016)
 (until 30 June 2016)

(Until 30 June 2016)
(Until 30 June 2016)
 (Until 30 June 2016)
 (until 30 June 2016)
 (Until 30 June 2016)

 (until 30 June 2016)
 (until 30 June 2016)
 (until 30 June 2016)
 (until 30 June 2016)

Friendlies

July friendlies

Afyon Cup

August friendlies

May friendlies

Competitions

Super League Greece

League table

Results summary

Results by round

Matches

1. Matchday 2 vs. Levadiakos, originally meant to be held in Levadia at Levadia Municipal Stadium, but due to the bad condition of the stadium Super League Greece decided to be held in Athens at the Olympic Stadium
2. Matches of Matchday 4 originally was scheduled to be held in 19/20/21 September 2015, but due to the Elections to be held on 20 September 2015 Super League Greece, decided the Matchday 4 to be held 22/23 September 2015.
3.  Due to extreme fan behavior against Olympiacos, the match was awarded as a 3–0 win for Olympiacos.

Greek Football Cup

Second round

Group E

Third round

Quarter-finals

Semi-finals

Final

UEFA Champions League

Group stage

UEFA Europa League

Olympiacos qualified to UEFA Europa League knock-out stage as the 3rd team of Champions League Group F.

Round of 32

Statistics

Goal scorers

Last updated: 5  November 2015

References

External links 
 Official Website of Olympiacos Piraeus 

Olympiacos F.C. seasons
Olympiacos
Olympiacos F.C.
Greek football championship-winning seasons